The Cambridge School of Weston (also known as CSW or The Cambridge School) is an independent, coeducational high school in Weston, Massachusetts. Currently, the school has 325 students in grades 9 to 12, with approximately 70% day students and 30% boarding students.

History 
The school was founded in 1886 as The Cambridge School for Girls at 20 Mason Street in Cambridge, Massachusetts, by Arthur and Stella Gilman, who had previously helped found Radcliffe College, as a preparatory school for Radcliffe. In 1918, The Cambridge School for Girls merged with the Boston-based Haskell School, and was renamed The Cambridge-Haskell School. Lebanese-born poet Kahlil Gibran, an "intimate friend" of headmistress Mary Haskell, designed a ring for her students depicting a "flower" "growing" in an open "hand".

In 1931, the school was moved  to its present campus in Weston under the direction of then-head of school John French, became coeducational, and was renamed a final time as The Cambridge School of Weston (CSW). A follower of educational reformer John Dewey, French put in place many of the progressive educational underpinnings that still guide the school, such as a focus on the whole student, experiential learning, community involvement, and a low student-to-faculty ratio. In 1939, the school implemented a form of community self-governance modeled after the traditional New England town meeting. Following Robert's Rules of Order, the entire school community, including students, meet to propose and debate school rules and policies, elect representatives to school committees, and decide on other relevant topics to the community. The Cambridge School Town Meeting continues to be a central part of the school's community governance to the present day.

Academics 
The school has gained recognition as a pioneer of the Module System, implemented in 1973 by then Head of School Bob Sandoe.
The goal of the Module, or "Mod" System, is to provide a framework to allow students to focus on fewer subjects more intensively during a given term. The academic year is divided into six terms (known as modules) of six weeks apiece. A school day consists of four class blocks of 90 minutes each, with some classes spanning several consecutive blocks. Students take up to three academic and one extracurricular class per mod. Some classes, such as those in mathematics or a foreign language, continue for multiple mods. No two students have the same schedule; every student's schedule is unique to themself. Students submit what classes they would like to enroll in, and the faculty works on their schedule to fit their electives into their schedule, along with the required classes each class must participate in.

Tuition 
The Cambridge School of Weston's tuition for the 2019–2020 school year is $63,000 for boarding and $50,900 for day students. About 25% of students receive financial aid.

Initiatives
The Cambridge School of Weston finished building a Green building called the Garthwaite Center for Science and Art, with a dedication ceremony and day of environmental education events on October 20, 2007.

Athletics 

The Cambridge School of Weston offers the following interscholastic sports:
Soccer,
Cross country running,
Field hockey,
Basketball,
Baseball,
Ultimate,
Volleyball,
Tennis, and
Girls' lacrosse.

Additional fitness courses offered include:
Yoga,
Rock climbing,
Fencing,
Bicycling,
Weight training,
Golf,
Table tennis,
Dance, and 
Martial arts.

Notable alumni

 Miguel Arteta, director
Max Geller, performance artist and activist
Hilaria Baldwin, yoga instructor
 Louisa Bertman, illustrator
 Josh Clayton-Felt, singer-songwriter
 Andras Jones, actor, singer-songwriter
 Jennifer Coolidge, actress
 Robert M. Cunningham, cloud physicist
Aprille Ericsson-Jackson, aerospace engineer
 Ian Falconer, illustrator and author; noted for his Olivia the Pig series of children's books (that spawned an animated children's television series)
 Zach Feuer, artist
 Paul Michael Glaser, actor famous for playing Starsky from Starsky and Hutch
 Aspen Gollan, woodworker and furniture maker
 Susanna Kaysen, author of Girl, Interrupted
 Helen Keller, author, political activist, lecturer, and the first deaf-blind person to earn a Bachelor of Arts degree
Nia King, queer art activist and author
 Stephin Merritt, singer-songwriter
Hamilton Morris, journalist
 David Mugar, businessman and philanthropist
Steve Mumford, artist
Daniel Jose Older, writer
Esther Pasztory, art historian
 Douglas Preston, author
 Jonathan Roberts, screenwriter The Lion King, Monsters, Inc.
 Ella Williams, singer-songwriter and lead of Squirrel Flower
 Jonas Wood, artist
 Eric von Hippel, economist
 Kelly Zutrau, singer-songwriter and lead of Wet
 Jesse Novak, composer and songwriter, best known for Bojack Horseman and The Mindy Project
 Suzanne M. Rivera, president of Macalester College

References

 de Lone, Richard H. and Susan T., John Dewey is Alive and Well in New England, Saturday Review, November 21, 1970, pages 69–71. Included in: The New World of Educational Thought, Frank A. Stone, editor (Ardent Media, 1973.), pages 182–189.

External links

 The Cambridge School of Weston website
 The Cambridge School of Weston alumni/ae website

1886 establishments in Massachusetts
Buildings and structures in Weston, Massachusetts
Educational institutions established in 1886
Private high schools in Massachusetts
Private preparatory schools in Massachusetts
Schools in Middlesex County, Massachusetts